Michael James Sullivan (born January 1, 1955) is an American professional golfer who has played on the PGA Tour, Nationwide Tour and Champions Tour.

Biography 
Sullivan was born in Gary, Indiana.  He attended Forest High School in Ocala, Florida, where he played for the Forest Wildcats high school golf team.

He accepted an athletic scholarship to attend the University of Florida in Gainesville, Florida, and played for coach Buster Bishop's Florida Gators men's golf team in 1974.  While attending Florida, Sullivan was a roommate of fellow future PGA Tour player Andy Bean.  He turned professional in 1975 and joined the PGA Tour in 1976.

Sullivan won three PGA Tour events during his career.  His first win came at the 1980 Southern Open which he calls the biggest thrill of his career due to being paired with golf legend Arnold Palmer in the third round.  He had more than forty top-10 finishes in PGA Tour events during his career.  Sullivan qualified for and played in every major championship at least twice. His best finish in a major championship was T12 at the 1989 PGA Championship.

Sullivan also had a runner-up finish on the European Tour, finishing 2nd place in the 1983 English Open. He lost to Hugh Baiocchi in a playoff.

Sullivan played some events on the Nationwide Tour in his 40s.  His best finish in a Nationwide Tour event was a second-place tie in the 1998 NIKE Dominion Open.

Sullivan played on the Champions Tour in 2005 and 2006.  His best finish was T9 at the 2005 Blue Angels Classic.

Sullivan lives in Ocala, Florida.

Professional wins (4)

PGA Tour wins (3)

PGA Tour playoff record (0–4)

Other wins (1)

Playoff record
European Tour playoff record (0–1)

Results in major championships

CUT = missed the half-way cut
"T" = tied

Personal life
He called for professional basketball player Mahmoud Abdul-Rauf to be shot, after he refused to stand for the pledge of allegiance.

See also

Fall 1976 PGA Tour Qualifying School graduates
1985 PGA Tour Qualifying School graduates
1991 PGA Tour Qualifying School graduates
Florida Gators
List of Florida Gators men's golfers on the PGA Tour

References

External links

American male golfers
Florida Gators men's golfers
PGA Tour golfers
PGA Tour Champions golfers
Golfers from Indiana
Golfers from Florida
Sportspeople from Gary, Indiana
Sportspeople from Ocala, Florida
1955 births
Living people